Paddington Green is a green space and conservation area in the City of Westminster located off Edgware Road and adjacent to the Westway. It is the oldest part of Paddington and became a separate conservation area in 1988, having previously formed part of Maida Vale conservation area. At one time, the Green was surrounded by large Georgian houses, but now only two remain on the east side of the Green.

History and notable buildings
Paddington Green contains part of the ancient Paddington and Lilestone villages which became fashionable at the end of the 18th century because of its village setting and proximity to the West End of London. An omnibus service to the City of London was introduced in 1829 by George Shillibeer.
 
St Mary on Paddington Green Church is part of the Parish of Little Venice and is the third church on this site. The church was built in 1791 by John Plaw. Its graveyard – known as St Mary's Gardens (or St Mary's Churchyard) – contains monuments to notable local residents, including actress Sarah Siddons (also buried there), sculptor Joseph Nollekens and lexicographer Peter Mark Roget. The southern part of the graveyard was removed to make way for the flyover. Exhumed graves were re-interred in Mill Hill Cemetery.

The former Paddington Green Children's Hospital (1883–1987), now an apartment block, stands on the north-east corner of the Green on Church Street. It is a Grade II listed building. The Schmidt Hammer Lassen-designed City of Westminster College is located at 25 Paddington Green.

In popular culture
 Pretty Polly Perkins of Paddington Green, the music hall number by Harry Clifton, is described as living: "in a gentleman's family near Paddington Green".
 The TV series Paddington Green aired in the late 1990s and explored the lives of residents of the local area.

 The Broadway musical Oliver! has Oliver Twist meeting the Artful Dodger at Paddington Green.

References

External links
Lyrics to Pretty Polly Perkins of Paddington Green
British History Online description
Paddington Green Borough Control BUNKER
Westminster City Council description and map

Parks and open spaces in the City of Westminster
Districts of the City of Westminster
Areas of London
Conservation areas in London
Paddington